M186 may refer to:

M-186 (Michigan highway), a state highway
Mercedes-Benz M186 engine, an automobile engine
Minardi M186, a Formula One race car